Fatehabad may refer to:
 Fatehabad, Afghanistan
 Fatehabad, Agra, a village in Uttar Pradesh, India
 Fatehabad, a historical pargana in Bengal; see Faridpur Division
 Fatehabad district, a district in Haryana, India
 Fatehabad, Haryana, the eponymous headquarters town of the Fatehabad district
 Fatehabad, Kavar, a village in Fars Province, Iran
 Fatehabad, Kurdistan, a village in Kurdistan Province, Iran
 Fatehabad, Madhya Pradesh, a city in Madhya Pradesh, India
 Fatehabad, Marvdasht, a village in Fars Province, Iran
 Fatehabad, Punjab, a small town in Punjab, India
 Fatehabad, Raebareli, a village in Uttar Pradesh, India
 Fatehabad, Uttar Pradesh, a city in Uttar Pradesh, India
 Fatehabad Chandrawatiganj Junction railway station, a railway station in Madhya Pradesh, India

See also
 Fathabad (disambiguation)